

Oman
 Mombasa – Nasr ibn Abdallah al-Mazru‘i, Wali of Mombasa (1698–1728)

Ottoman Empire 
 Principality of Abkhazia – Jigetshi (1700–1730)

Great Britain
 Massachusetts – Joseph Dudley, Governor of Massachusetts Bay Colony (1702–1715)

Portugal
 Angola – Lourenço de Almada, Governor of Angola (1705–1709)
 Macau – Diogo do Pinho Teixeira, Governor of Macau (1706–1710)
 '''Mozambique – Governor of Mozambique
 Luís de Brito Freire, Governor (1706–1708)
 Luís Gonçalves da Câmara, Governor (1708–1712)

Colonial governors
Colonial governors
1708